Aaron Taylor-Sinclair (born 8 April 1991) is a professional footballer who plays as a left-back for Airdrieonians in Scottish League One. Born in Scotland, he represents the Antigua and Barbuda national team.

Taylor-Sinclair started his career at Aberdeen as a youth player, having been scouted by the club at age ten. He then joined Scottish Third Division club Montrose, where he played for three years and scored five goals. His talents were then spotted by First Division side Partick Thistle in 2011. After a successful spell at Thistle (including promotion to the Scottish Premiership), Taylor-Sinclair signed for English Championship side Wigan Athletic in 2014.

After spells with Doncaster Rovers and Plymouth Argyle, Taylor-Sinclair returned to Scottish football in 2018 with Motherwell. He spent the second half of the 2019–20 season on loan at Crewe Alexandra and was then released by Motherwell in May 2019. He then had two years with Livingston, before a six-month spell with Falkirk in 2022.

Club career

Montrose
Taylor-Sinclair began his career with Montrose as a youngster. He began playing football at the age of seven for Middlefield Wasps Boys Club. He then was scouted by Aberdeen Football Club at the age of 10 where he played for five years. He had one season at Albion Boys Club before moving to Montrose where he made his debut on the final day of the 2008–09 season against Albion Rovers. During the following two seasons he became a first team regular at Links Park. His first goal came on 16 March 2010, against Forfar Athletic, with his second coming four days later. In his second season, Sinclair scored three goals within the opening two months and was named as Scottish Football League Young Player of the Month for September 2010. His form over the two seasons at Links Park, earned him the chance to train with SPL side St Johnstone.

Partick Thistle

Taylor-Sinclair signed for First Division side Partick Thistle on 5 July 2011, where he signed a two-year contract for an undisclosed fee. He made his competitive debut during a 2–1 victory against Stenhousemuir in the Scottish Challenge Cup on 23 July 2011. His impressive form at the start of the season, led to some attraction from English Championship clubs, such as Cardiff City and Southampton. and he was given the SFL Young Player of the Month award for October 2011.

Taylor-Sinclair played an instrumental part in season 2012–13 as Partick Thistle won the First Division Championship. His impressive form at Thistle sparked interest from Glasgow rivals Celtic and from English clubs including Cardiff City and Middlesbrough.

Wigan Athletic
In June 2014, Taylor-Sinclair left Thistle for a move to English Championship club Wigan Athletic. He made his debut for the club in a 2–1 defeat away to Burton Albion in the League Cup.

Doncaster Rovers
On 20 July 2015, Taylor-Sinclair joined League One side Doncaster Rovers on a two-year contract. In the final match of the 2015–16 season, against Burton Albion, he suffered an injury which was expected to keep him out for up to nine months.

Plymouth Argyle
On 28 June 2017, Taylor-Sinclair joined League One Plymouth Argyle. He was released by Plymouth at the end of the 2017–18 season.

Motherwell
Taylor-Sinclair signed a one-year contract with Scottish Premiership club Motherwell in June 2018.

On 30 January 2019, Taylor-Sinclair was loaned to English League Two side Crewe Alexandra until the end of the season. He made his Crewe debut on 16 February 2019 coming on as a second-half substitute for Harry Pickering at Oldham Athletic, and scored his first Crewe goal on 30 March 2019 against Cheltenham Town at Gresty Road.

In May 2019, Taylor-Sinclair was released by Motherwell at the end of his contract.

Livingston
On 6 November 2019, Taylor-Sinclair signed a short-term contract with Livingston. Taylor-Sinclair would sign an extension to stay for the full season, and later another extension to stay at the club for the 2020–21 season. It was announced in May 2021 that Taylor-Sinclair would be released upon the expiry of his contract at the end of the season.

Falkirk 
On 29 December 2021, Taylor-Sinclair signed with Scottish League One side Falkirk until the end of the 2021–22 season, scoring on his debut in a 6-2 win against Dumbarton. Taylor-Sinclair was released by Falkirk at the end of the 2021–22 season.

Airdrieonians 
On 1 September 2022, following his release from Falkirk, Taylor-Sinclair signed with fellow League One side Airdrieonians.

International career
Born in Scotland, Taylor-Sinclair is of Antiguan descent. He was called up to represent the Antigua and Barbuda national team for a pair of friendlies in June 2021. He debuted for Antigua and Barbuda in a 1–0 2022 FIFA World Cup qualification win over Grenada on 4 June 2021.

Career statistics

Honours
Partick Thistle
Scottish First Division: 2012–13

Individual
Scottish Football League Young Player of the month: September 2010 & October 2011
PFA Scotland First Division Team of the Year: 2011–12 & 2012–13

References

External links

1991 births
Living people
Footballers from Aberdeen
Antigua and Barbuda footballers
Antigua and Barbuda international footballers
Scottish footballers
Scottish people of Antigua and Barbuda descent
British sportspeople of Antigua and Barbuda descent
Association football fullbacks
Partick Thistle F.C. players
Montrose F.C. players
Scottish Football League players
Scottish Professional Football League players
English Football League players
Wigan Athletic F.C. players
Doncaster Rovers F.C. players
Plymouth Argyle F.C. players
Motherwell F.C. players
Crewe Alexandra F.C. players
Livingston F.C. players
Falkirk F.C. players
Airdrieonians F.C. players